Roger Dale Rosentreter (born 1951) is a botanist, plant ecologist, naturalist, and conservationist. He was the president of the American Bryological and Lichenological Society from 2011 to 2013.

Education and career
Rosentreter graduated in 1974 with B.A. in botany and biology from the University of Montana and in 1976 with M.A. in biology from Clark University. From 1978 to 1977 in Browning, Montana he was a high school science teacher in biology and earth science, as well a cross-country and track coach. From March 1978 to January 2013 he was a U.S. Bureau of Land Management (BLM) employee, based in Boise, Idaho. He worked for the BLM both statewide and regionally, often as an educator. At BLM's Idaho State Office he was the program manager for rare and endangered plants and for weed management. He also assisted on wildlife projects, vegetation mapping, and land restoration. During his BLM career he received in 1984 a Ph.D. in botany from the University of Montana. There he taught courses in plant taxonomy, plant physiology, and agrostology. He was an adjunct professor at several universities, directed independent study in several academic disciplines, and was an occasional substitute professor in general botany, mycology, plant systematics, and mammalogy. Beginning in 1988, he served as a graduate faculty committee member at Boise State University, Idaho State University, Brigham Young University and Utah State University for several M.S. and Ph.D. students. At Boise State University he taught, from 1985 to 1989, flatwater and whitewater canoeing and, from 2001 to 2012, landscaping with native plants.

During his BLM career and during his retirement, Rosentreter collected more than 19,000 specimens, the vast majority being lichens, and donated duplicates of the specimens to herbaria all over the world. He is a leading expert on Idaho's rare plant species and has made a particular effort to protect the species Lewisia sacajaweana. He harshly criticized the methods used by the BLM in its rehabilitation efforts for sage grouse habitat following the 2015 Soda Fire, which burned nearly 280,000 acres in Idaho and Oregon southwest of Boise. He is the author or co-author of nearly 100 scientific publications. He has done considerable research in grass ecology, cheatgrass control, and firewise landscaping and planning.

An avid kayaker and naturalist, Rosentreter has participated in efforts to remove trash from the Boise River and its beaches.
In 2006 he received the Idaho Weed Hall of Fame Award from the Idaho Noxious Weed Control Association.

Selected publications

References

External links

 
 

1951 births
Living people
American lichenologists
Plant collectors
20th-century American botanists
21st-century American botanists
University of Montana alumni
Clark University alumni
Bureau of Land Management personnel